Weatherwax Glacier is a glacier which occupies the elevated basin south of Mount Barnes in Kukri Hills, Victoria Land. It drains southeast from 800 m elevation and terminates in a narrow glacial snout on rock bluffs 200 m above New Harbour. Named by Advisory Committee on Antarctic Names (US-ACAN) (2000) after Allan T. Weatherwax, physicist, Dean, School of Science & Engineering, Merrimack College, who conducted investigations of the atmosphere, ionosphere, and magnetosphere at McMurdo Station, South Pole Station, and several of the Automated Geophysical Observatories (AGOs) located on the Antarctic plateau; completed 10 field seasons in Antarctica, 1988-89 through 1998–99.

Glaciers of Victoria Land
McMurdo Dry Valleys